Fashion Targets Breast Cancer is a charity campaign originally launched in the UK in 1996 by Breakthrough Breast Cancer, and now operated under the charity's new name Breast Cancer Now. Corporate partners for the campaign represent famous high-street brands, including M & S, Topshop, and River Island. M & S has sold a wide range of charitable women's clothes for Breast Cancer Now for many years. The campaign is best known for its famous 'target' logo T-shirt designed by Ralph Lauren. Since 1996, Fashion Targets Breast Cancer has raised over £14 million to fund pioneering breast cancer research.

Campaigns 
2016 - Naomi Campbell and Kate Moss
2015 - Foxes, Abbey Clancy, Lily Donaldson, and Alice Dellal
2014 - Emeli Sandé, Jessica Ennis-Hill and Laura Bailey
2013 - Sharon Osbourne, Kelly Osbourne, Pearl Lowe and Daisy Lowe
2012 - Georgia May Jagger and Pixie Geldof
2011 - Cat Deeley, Karen Gillan and Sadie Frost
2010 - Kylie Minogue, Claudia Schiffer and Sienna Miller
2009 - Million Model Catwalk - Leah Wood, Sarah Ferguson, Jade Jagger, Bryan Ferry, Abigail Clancy, Sara Cox, Duncan James and June Sarpong
2008 - Anna Friel, Natalie Imbruglia, Alan Carr, Edith Bowman and Twiggy
2007 - Sophie Dahl
2006 - Claudia Schiffer, Helena Christensen, Eva Herzigova, Jerry Hall, Yasmin Le Bon, Erin O'Connor, Laura Bailey, Lily Cole, Jasmine Guinness and Liberty Ross
2005 - Jade Jagger
2004 - Elle Macpherson
2003 - Jodie Kidd, Edith Bowman
2002 - Helena Christensen
2000 - Gisele Bündchen, Twiggy and Kate Moss
1998 - Yasmin Le Bon
1996 - Naomi Campbell, Christy Turlington and Saffron Aldridge

See also
List of Marks & Spencer brands

References

External links
 
 Breast Cancer Now
 Fashion Blogging

Health charities in the United Kingdom
Cancer organisations based in the United Kingdom
1996 establishments in the United Kingdom
Organizations established in 1996